Marwin Jonathan Pita Mora (born April 17, 1985) is an Ecuadorian footballer currently playing for LDU Portoviejo. He plays as a striker for his team.

Club career
Pita has played for many teams in Ecuador, including Macará, L.D.U. Quito, and El Nacional.

Liga de Quito
In his youth years he played for L.D.U. Quito. Although he came out of the youth ranks of LDUQ, he made no appearances for his team. Liga was not interested with Pita and as a result he was loaned out to Macará.

Macará
In 2005, Marwin was loaned out to Macará. For two years he stayed in Macará scoring goals. He was a key player and was having marvelous performances. In a game against Azogues, he had a hat-trick and was the best player of that game. He caught the eye of several Ecuadorian teams primarily Emelec and El Nacional. His hard work and talent gave him a good result during the end of his contract with Macará in the 2007 winter transfer window.

El Nacional
In the winter transfer window of 2008, Marwin was granted a loan move to El Nacional. He was used as a substitute during his first days with his new club. However, he became an important player for the club and is now a regular starter being used as a midfielder or a striker. He has been scoring goals for Nacional and is one of the best players of his team.

LDU Portoviejo
On 21 January 2019, Marwin joined LDU Portoviejo.

References

External links
El Nacional profile

1985 births
Living people
People from Portoviejo
Association football midfielders
Ecuadorian footballers
L.D.U. Quito footballers
C.S.D. Macará footballers
C.D. El Nacional footballers
Mushuc Runa S.C. footballers
C.D. Clan Juvenil footballers
L.D.U. Portoviejo footballers
Ecuador international footballers